Immaculate Heart of Mary Church, is a Catholic parish church in Cleveland, Ohio and part of the Diocese of Cleveland. It is a located on Lansing Ave. near East 66th St., in a part of the South Broadway neighborhood previously known as Warszawa, also referred to today as Slavic Village. Both the church and the area are GNIS named features. The church is in the neighborhood of, but not within, the area listed as Warszawa Neighborhood District on the National Register of Historic Places. The church, school, rectory, and convent buildings are listed together as a Cleveland Designated Landmark.

The parish was founded in 1894.

History

Founding in Schism
The independent schismatic congregation, under the title of Independent Polish Catholic Church of the Immaculate Heart of the Blessed Virgin Mary or Immaculate Heart of the Blessed Virgin Mary, was founded 3 May 1894 — about 47 years after the Diocese of Cleveland was erected by Pope Pius IX.

The founding happened at the beginning of the Progressive Era after the Panic of 1893.

The founder, Rev.  (né Rademacher), also known as Rademacher Kolaszewski and Kolaszewski-Rademacher, was born 5 September 1851 in Elżbietów, Poland and immigrated to the United States at about the age of eight.

Kolaszewski made his collegiate studies in the Franciscan College, in Teutopolis, Illinois; then entered St. Mary's Seminary, Cleveland, where, after completing the prescribed course in philosophy and theology, had been ordained for the Diocese of Cleveland, by Bishop Richard Gilmour on 1 July 1883, and was appointed the first resident pastor of St. Stanislaus' church a few weeks after his ordination. Between 1886 and 1890, frequent charges were made against Kolaszewski. Within two months after Bishop Ignatius Frederick Horstmann came to the diocese, another grave charge was made against Kolaszewski. He was unable to disprove it, and so, on 28 May 1892, offered his resignation. His resignation was accepted by Horstmann, on condition that he leave the diocese, which he did. He moved from Cleveland to Syracuse, New York. There he worked as a priest, known as Father Colley, and founded Sacred Heart Church, the first Polish parish church in the Roman Catholic Diocese of Syracuse. He had also been practicing medicine without a license. The Syracuse Courier reported that he "had built up quite an extensive practice drawn mostly from the female portion of the community" and his practice had been brought to the attention of the Onondaga County Medical Society. He was repeatedly served with notices to desist but kept on with his practice. The matter was then brought to the attention of Bishop Patrick Anthony Ludden, but even his disapproval had no effect on his actions. Finally, the Medical society arranged for his arrest. Early in April 1894 he left suddenly and mysteriously; the Syracuse Courier conjectured that he probable learned of his impending arrest and left Syracuse to avoid prosecution. He visited Cleveland and returned to Syracuse on business in May. Kolaszewski remained in Syracuse until May, 1894, when he returned to Cleveland and organized a congregation of his followers from St. Stanislaus' church.

Horstmann referred the case to the Apostolic Nunciature to the United States; Titular Archbishop Francesco Satolli, the Apostolic Nuncio, sent Horstmann his reply;

On 1894-06-20, Kolaszewski was excommunicated by Horstmann.

And, the congregation was warned.

"Despite their growing numbers, Poles were not represented in the Catholic hierarchy in the United States for many years. This became an increasing source of tension in the Polish-American community, resulting in the founding of schismatic churches in the Polish community. In 1895 in Chicago, Resurrection Father , assistant pastor of St. Hedwig Parish, led 1,000 of the parish's 1,300 families in founding the 'Independent Catholic Church in America.' Within three years, the Independent Polish Catholic Church in America claimed 17,000 members. In 1897 in Scranton, Pennsylvania, Father Francis Hodur founded the Polish National Catholic Church. Both had themselves consecrated bishops by the Union of Old Catholic Churches in Holland." Also, doctrines of Americanism were held by and taught by many members of the Catholic clergy and hierarchy in the United States in the 1890s. Catholic leaders in the United States denied they held these views.

On July 28, 1894, The Weekly Messenger, in St. Martinville, Louisiana, reported on an article in the Chicago Inter Ocean that announced their new Polish national committee and invited dissatisfied Poles from all over the United States to join their revolutionary church movement. The article also informed that the denomination would probably be the Armenian Apostolic Church. A priest of that church, Mr. Knowles, was in conference with the Patriarch of Antioch seeking consecration to the episcopate; if Knowles succeeded, he probably would have consecrated Kolaszewski a bishop. That same year, Kolaszewski was associated with the Old Catholic Church missionary Archbishop Joseph René Vilatte; Rev. Constantine Klukowski, OFM, wrote that an 1894 Green Bay, Wisconsin city directory lists Kolaszewski as vicar-general of Vilatte's American Catholic St. Louis Church.

The original Immaculate Heart of Mary church was dedicated on August 18, 1894 by Vilatte. Later that day, a procession, accompanied by three mounted policemen, walking to consecrate the cemetery, was met by an angry mob. Walking back from the cemetery,  The dedication of Immaculate Heart of Mary church and convention, to form an independent Polish Catholic Church, took place on the same week St. Stanislaus church hosted the Twenty-First Convention of the Polish Roman Catholic Union of America, ("PRCUA"), the oldest Polish American organization in the United States. The national convention of Polish Catholics began August 22, 1894 in the original church. Vilatte presided over schismatic delegates from Buffalo, New York, Freeland, Pennsylvania, Jersey City, New Jersey, Baltimore, Chicago, Milwaukee, Detroit, Omaha, Nebraska, Pittsburgh, St. Louis, Bremond, Texas, and Winona, Minnesota. Vilatte, opened the convention, urging that the Catholic religion be left intact. Remarks were made on the need to announce a platform. Motions were made to renounce allegiance to the Pope, and to recognize Vilatte as the head of the new church. Kolaszewski opposed the first motion, saying that its passage would result in criticism and injury to the group. The first motion lost; the second motion carried. A resolution was passed establishing the name American Catholic Church for the group. The names of Polish National Church and Polish Independent Church were suggested, but were thought to be too narrow. Kolaszewski was chosen vicar general. Tho basis of a constitution was adopted, providing for the ownership of church property by priests, tho right of parishes to call the priests whom they desired, and a school system equivalent to the public schools. The name, American Catholic Church, was later used by Vilette in 1915 in the incorporation of the American Catholic Church in Illinois.

By the next year, Vilatte withdrew his involvement with the schism. It was reported September 6, 1895, that Vilatte said he will neither preside over nor be present at the September 12, 1895  convention, in Cleveland, and would not sanction the movement in any way. Vilatte reasoned that by their refusal to acknowledge the doctrines of the American Old Catholic Church as right, and by clinging to doctrines of the Roman Catholic Church, they are Roman Catholics in rebellion against their church, and as such he will have nothing to do with them. Vilatte wrote in a letter to the convention:

Vilatte stated that the convention in Cleveland will represent churches with a total membership of over 50,000.

The Third Great Awakening saw enormous growth in Methodist membership; in 1896, Kolaszewski proposed to turn the church with its congregation to the Methodist denomination. A sensational article, reported May 5, 1896-05-05, was printed in newspapers across the United States.

 The article reported Kolaszewski sat in Methodist Episcopal Church Chaplain C. O. McCabe's private box and followed the proceedings of a Methodist Episcopal Church convention being held in Cleveland. And, McCabe said Kolaszewski and his parishioners believe neither dogmas of Papal infallibility nor transubstantiation and want to join the Methodist Episcopal Church. It further reported that Kolaszewski offered to transfer the church, including all the valuable church property, and entire 3,000 member congregation to the Methodist Episcopal Church.

Although Papal infallibility was defined dogmatically in the First Vatican Council of 1869–1870, just about 15 years before the founding of the parish, and, Article XX of the parish constitution, as quoted by Radeker, rejected this dogma, Kolaszewski refused to say anything concerning the matter, and some versions of the article reported this was not a matter for this conference:

It was generally reported to be "an assured fact". McCabe said:

Kolaszewski responded to questions about McCabe's statement:

At least one newspaper printed an additional article the next day.

A few days later, on May 10, 1896-05-10, Kolaszewski couldn't be found; The Evening Times, of Washington, DC, printed a report, on May 6, 1896-05-16, that a group from Cleveland was searching for him in Baltimore, Maryland. The Evening Times also included information on the parishioners reactions to the May 6, 1896-05-06 newspaper reports. They were so infuriated that Kolaszewski fled for his own safety. Sigimund Stephan, president of the Polish-American Club of Baltimore, said that Jasinski, a prominent member of the Polish Independent Church, denied that the congregation was about to change its faith. He said the congregation was divided; one group, of about one hundred people, approving of Kolaszewski plan, and the rest disapproving. The same story is confusing because it also reports they visited Stephan to locate Kolaszewski through him, who was said to be in Baltimore collecting funds for a church which he proposes to build in Ohio.

In December, 1897, Kolaszewski became seriously ill, and asked to be received back into the Church. As the Holy See reserved his case, Horstmann could do nothing for him, unless Kolaszewski accepted the conditions imposed upon him: to retract; to submit; to do penance; and, to promise to, when he was physically able, travel to the Holy See and seek absolution. He refused this reconciliation.

That same year, Kolaszewski secured, through a Canadian agency, a $25,000 mortgage loan from England which enabled the congregation to continue. Radeker names Bishop John Bilsborrow of Salford as the source of this loan.

On August 30, 1908-08-30, parishioners voted in favor of applying for admittance of the independent parish into the Diocese of Cleveland.

Return to Union
On September 15, 1908, the parish was admitted into the Diocese of Cleveland.

On October 24, 1908-10-24, the parish was brought into full communion with the Catholic Church. An article, found in The Intermountain Colorado Catholic, the official newspaper of the Diocese of Salt Lake City, archived on the Library of Congress Chronicling America online collection, reported on the event:

Kolaszewski's excommunication was lifted on September 4, 1908 and he died on December 2, 1910, and he is buried in section nine, at Calvary Cemetery.

The parish was managed by a succession of administrators, Rev. M. Keilar, OFM 1908–1909; Rev. A. Migdalski, January to October 1909; Rev. J. Darowski, October 1909 to July 1910; and Rev. B. Walter, 1910–1912.

In February, 1912, the parish received its first permanent pastor since Kolaszewski, when Rev. Marion J. Orzechowski was appointed to that post. Orzechowski was born 1877 in Poland and came to Pittsburgh, Pa. in 1884, where he attended elementary school, then went St. Mary's College, Detroit for secondary education, and then studied theology at St. Charles Borromeos Seminary, Philadelphia, where he was ordained in 1899. After his time as Immaculate Heart, he was appointed pastor of St. John Cantius parish, Cleveland from 1933 to 1939. In 1925 he was elevated to the position of the Monsignor by the Holy See. Died May 3, 1939. He was also member of Polish Roman Catholic Union of America; Polish National Alliance; Chaplain of Polish Legion of American Veterans. Decorations: Cross of Merit, with Virtuti Militari, St. Gregory Order, Bethlehem Star, Haller's Swords.

In 1937, John Cardinal Król, on his first assignment, assisted for about one year.

Original Church
Church bells are customarily named in honor of saints and ceremonially blessed. The original wooden church's bell, named Franciszek, was cast in 1894 in St. Louis. and hung in the belfry of the single bell tower.

The original church was dedicated on August 18, 1894.

The original church, until its demolition in 1924, served as a school and meeting hall.

Present Church
The present church design is attributed to a well known Polish architect, although without formal credentials, from Minnesota, Anthony F. Wasielewski, and originally had a capacity to seat 1250 people. Construction began in 1913 with labor and materials furnished by the parish and supervision by Wasielewski. Wasielewski used blueprints copied from a church he constructed, Holy Family church in Tulsa, Oklahoma.

The present church was dedicated by Bishop John Patrick Farrelly on July 27, 1916-07-27.

Three bells were hung in two cupola crowned bell towers. The east tower housed Zygmunt, the largest of the three bells. The west tower housed Jozef and Franciszek, the bell from the original church. Both new bells, named Zygmunt and Jozef, were cast in 1920 in Troy, New York and Zygmunt is estimated to weigh about a ton.

After high winds damaged the west bell tower's cupola, in September 2010, the structural integrity of the cupolas was evaluated and found to be weakened.

On December 17, 2012, both bell tower cupolas where dismantled; the bell, Zygmunt, from the eastern tower, and both bells, Franciszek and Jozef, from the western tower, were removed.

A recording of the actual cast metal ring of bells chiming will be played as a substitute sound. Unfortunately, change ringing was never recorded.

Exterior
Liturgical direction rarely coincides with cardinal direction. Here, the apse is placed in the southern end of the church.

The church has a twin-towered facade with 
There are four additional side entrances, that provides entry directly into the nave, each face the front: a single door next to each tower and a single door in the front walls of the transept.

The cornerstone, located in the west corner of the facade, is inscribed with a carved line drawing of a heart below a Latin cross over the carved text .

Interior
Liturgical direction rarely coincides with cardinal direction. Here, the apse is placed in the southern end of the church.

The interior has a cruciform floor plan. The front of the church has a sanctuary with a semicircular apse with a hemispherical semi-dome.  Architecturally the central nave, also called the central aisle, is divided from the side aisles by arched columns. The church has a narthex. Two sacristies are connected by a passage behind the altar.

The transept and the nave barrel vaults intersect forming a groin vault over the crossing.

The interior was redecorated in 1935.

The interior was redecorated in 1958.

A modern 24 rank pipe organ was installed by the Wicks Organ Company in 1962.

The interior was redecorated in 1984.

Stained Glass Windows
In a sacred image the subject is important not the object; the object is a tool to contemplate the subject; the subject is a spiritual reality. The Benedictine Abbot Suger of Saint Denis called stained glass windows "sermons that reached the heart through the eyes instead of entering through the ears".

The church contains decorated windows of Munich art glass style stained glass protected with exterior rough flat glass windows. They were created by the Munich Studio of Chicago under the direction of Max Guler. Guler, a master of the style, had studied painting in Munich, Germany. Many of them are signed and were installed from 1914 to 1918. They are not just leadlights, decorative windows made of small sections of glass supported in lead cames, but are authentic stained glass; the painters employed by Munich Studio used dark brown vitreous oxide and silver stain to paint designs on pieces of various types of glass. These types included glasses differing in color and translucency. Guler's windows are heavily painted with dark oxides but the glass retains its luminosity because of his masterful brushwork. Even on cloudy days, the windows shine with vibrant colors. The windows created at the Munich Studio also show great detail, especially in facial expressions.

Two windows, in the sacristies at either side of the main altar, are not generally visible to the public:
The window, in the sacristy for clergy, right of the main altar, depicts Jesus as the Mass figure. Jesus and two disciples have nimbi; transverse lines, forming a cross, pass beyond the circumference of the nimbus behind Jesus' head.
The window, in the sacristy for altar servers, left of the main altar, depicts Canaanite priest Melchizedek, a type of Christ. His offering of bread and wine prefigures the Eucharist. He is mentioned in the Canon of the Mass. None of the figures have nimbi.

The two windows in the transept are the largest in the church.
The windows in the left semi-transept depict Christ preaching at the Sea of Galilee.> The semi-circle part of this window depicts from left to right: an IHS Christogram, the Lamb of God,
The windows in the right semi-transept depict St. Dominic and Our Lady of the Rosary.

The five windows in the east side aisle, or the left side, from the front to the back are depictions of:
Christ calming the storm on the Sea of Galilee.
Black Madonna of Częstochowa, in clouds, above Our Holy Patrons. On the left is St. Longinus holding the Holy Lance. A Polish National Alliance coat of arms is displayed at the bottom.
The Baptism of Jesus. Depicting rays emanating from the Holy Spirit, in the shape of a dove, above a bearded Jesus, who is immersed just above his ankles, while John the Baptist affuses water over Jesus' head. A winged ministering angel, holding white lilies, hovers behind Jesus. We see nimbi on Jesus and John the Baptist.
St. Marguerite Marie Alacoque, patron saint for devotees of the Sacred Heart and against loss of parents. She received visions revealing the forms of Sacred Heart devotion: reception of Eucharist on the First Friday Devotions of each month, Eucharistic adoration during the Holy Hour on Thursdays, and celebration of the Feast of the Sacred Heart. 
The Holy Family, with the Sacred Heart shown within the Child Jesus' bosom, surrounded by children. Titled Children's Hearts Offering.

The five windows in the west side aisle, or the right side, from the front to the back are depictions of:
The Holy Family, with Child Jesus feeding a rooster. Jesus compared His care for Jerusalem to that of a hen for her brood.
The Assumption of Mary.
Saints Cyril and Methodius, known as the Apostles to the Slavs, were ecumenical in their outlook and may be patron saints for Ecumenism. They are titled as saints equal-to-apostles by the Eastern Orthodox Church and by Eastern Catholic Churches that are in full communion with the Holy See. But, there is little record of Christian influence on Polish tribes before the 960s. Only St. Methodius wears a golden . 
A wooden cross, draped in black cloth, with the inscription 966 and the Sacred Heart above a ship anchor on the cross. A foreboding sky filled with dark grey clouds, except for a golden sun in the upper right corner. The background featuring Sigismund's Column and  titled Poland in Chains.
Saint Adalbert of Prague, patron saint of Poland. He was martyred in his efforts to convert Baltic Prussian tribes, over 200 years before the Prussian Crusade, after destroying a pagan sacred grove.

Three windows, in the choir, depict, from west to east:
Saint Casimir, patron saint of Lithuania, Poland, and the young. He was crown prince of the Kingdom of Poland and of the Grand Duchy of Lithuania.
Saint Cecilia, patron saint for musicians and of Church music. She is one of seven women, excluding the Blessed Virgin Mary, commemorated by name in the Canon of the Mass.
Saint Blaise, patron saint of against illness of the throat and for protection of domestic animals, holding two candles. He is one of the Fourteen Holy Helpers.

In 1987 the windows were repaired and protected, from the elements and vandals, with exterior acrylic panels.

Murals

Statuary

Stations of the Cross
Fourteen Stations of the Cross are placed along the walls of the side aisles. Used together with prayers, meditations, and songs, they are a devotion to Jesus, either private or public, commemorating the Passion; they are a pilgrimage to the holy places in Jerusalem.

School

Immaculate Heart of Mary had a school for students K-8. When it was a school, the Sisters of Saint Joseph of the Third Order St. Francis-Marymount Province(Garfield Heights) staffed the school. In 1988, Immaculate Heart of Mary school merged with nearby Sacred Heart Parish. The school was renamed Jesus and Mary School. In 2003, citing low enrollment and competition from nearby Saint Stanislaus Parish School, Jesus and Mary School closed.

Notes and references

Notes

References

Further reading
 
wiktionary:schism

External links
Official Parish Website

20th-century Roman Catholic church buildings in the United States
Roman Catholic churches in Cleveland
Roman Catholic churches completed in 1916
Religious organizations established in 1894
Churches in the Roman Catholic Diocese of Cleveland
Slavic Village
Polish-American culture in Cleveland
1894 establishments in Ohio